Isipingo is a town situated  south of Durban in KwaZulu-Natal, South Africa and currently forms part of eThekwini Metropolitan Municipality. The town is named after the Siphingo River, which in turn is thought to be named (in the Zulu language) for the intertwining cat-thorn shrubs (Scutia myrtina) present in the area, or the river's winding course.

History 
Dick King went to Natal in 1828 and was awarded a large stretch of land between the Umlaas/uMlaza and Mbokodweni rivers at present-day Isipingo Rail, an area where he had already acquired some farmland and built himself a house. King managed a sugar mill in Isipingo until his death in 1871 and was buried in the town.

In May 1853, the Natal Mercury reported that Mr Jeffels of Isipingo ventured into sugarcane cultivation and is erecting buildings for sugar manufacturing. The indenture system was used from 1860 to supply cheap Indian labour to the sugar cane farms in Isipingo and the surrounding areas.

In 1880, the railway line named the South Coast Line extension from Rossburgh in Durban to Isipingo Rail was completed and opened. Between 1893 and the outbreak of the Second Boer War, the South Coast Line was extended 44 km (27 mi) from Isipingo Rail to Park Rynie.

In 1962, the Natal Provincial Council made a decision to incorporate Isipingo Rail and Isipingo Beach into the Borough of Amanzimtoti, a seaside town 10 kilometres further south and 1963, Isipingo Rail and Isipingo Beach were declared Indian Group Areas. By government decree, Isipingo Beach and Isipingo Rail would be amalgamated into a single Indian area, to be called Isipingo.

In 1972, Isipingo was no longer under the administration of Amanzimtoti and instead was governed by the Isipingo Town Board, an all-Indian self-governing local authority and later in 1974 achieved Borough status.

The elite apartheid era suburb of Isipingo Hills was then created.

World War II plane crashes 

During the Second World War the Coastal Command (Southern Air Command SAAF) deployed 10 Squadron SAAF at Durban and Isipingo – this unit functioned as a torpedo bomber/ coastal reconnaissance squadron. They operated from runways that had been cut out of sugarcane fields- it was in this area that the main runway of the now defunct Durban International Airport was later built. The squadron headquarters is now home to the Amanzimtoti Country Club (originally named Isipingo Golf Club).

In 1942 the squadron returned to its defense purposes and were re-equipped with Mohawks and Kittyhawks.  There are several incidents of Kittyhawk crashes near Isipingo:

 5009 - crashed near Isipingo on 19 June 1944, 2Lt C. V. J. Giddey survived
 5010 - crashed near Isipingo on 7 December 1943
 5013 - caught fire in flight and crashed near Umbilo on 1 November 1943, 2Lt F. E. Hamm survived
 5014 - stalled after takeoff and crashed near Isipingo on 2 October 1943, 2Lt K. L. Clur survived
 5021 - crashed near Isipingo on 4 October 1943, 2Lt R. A. Hamlyn killed
 5027 - crashed near Isipingo on 22 December 1943, 2Lt A. N. Blake killed
 5082 - crashed near Isipingo on 18 December 1944

Geography 
Isipingo is surrounded by Reunion and the defunct Durban International Airport to the north, the Indian Ocean to the east, Athlone Park and Umbogintwini to the south and Umlazi to the west.

Isipingo is divided into seven neighbourhoods, the most established and notable ones being Isipingo Rail (inland alongside the railway) and Isipingo Beach (on a high ridge of sand at the mouth of the Siphingo River) which are separated by the flat industrial area of Prospecton.

Isipingo Hills and Malaba Hills are built on the hilly inland area north of the Siphingo River around Isipingo Rail and Lotus Park, Orient Hills and Malukazi are located on the hilly inland area south of the Siphingo River. Isipingo Rail, the commercial and retail hub of Isipingo serves as the area's Central Business District.

Economy 
The Isipingo Central Business District is an important retail and transport hub, with many national retailers present. Significant wholesale stores also exist in the Isipingo area.

The adjoining major industrial area of Prospecton is the location of one of South Africa's largest automobile assembly plants, that of Toyota. The facility, covering almost , is a place of employment for many Isipingo residents.

Amenities 
The amenities of Isipingo include a police station, a SASSA office, two libraries which are the Provincial Isipingo Civic Library in Orient Hills and the Isipingo Beach Library, a private hospital named Isipingo Hospital in Isipingo Hills and three shopping centres which are all in Isipingo Rail namely Isipingo Main, Isipingo Junction and the Isipingo Retail Development (a new retail development on the railway station completed in 2020).

The area has access to fine beaches, Reunion Park Beach, Isipingo Beach River Mouth, Tiger Rocks Beach and Dakota Beach, which are regularly frequented by bathers and fishermen, especially during the sardine run.

Transport

Rail 
Isipingo's railway station is located in Isipingo Rail and is served by the commuter railway service of Metrorail. It lies on the South Coast Line which connects to Reunion and Durban in the north-east and Umbogintwini, Amanzimtoti, Kingsburgh, Umgababa, Umkomaas, Scottburgh and Kelso in the south-west.

Roads 
Isipingo Rail is served by its main artery road, Phila Ndwandwe Road (previously Old South Coast Road) which begins at the intersection with the M30 Griffiths Mxenge Highway in Umlazi and ends at the M35 Wilcox Road in Isipingo Hills.

The Isipingo area is also served by a number of other arterial routes such as the N2 national highway which runs through Prospecton and links to Durban and KwaDukuza in the north and Amanzimtoti and Port Shepstone in the south, the R102 linking to Reunion and Durban in the north and Amanzimtoti in the south, the M35 Willcox Road linking to Umlazi Mega City in the north and Umlazi in the west and Mfundi Mngadi Drive to Umbogintwini and KwaMakhutha to the south.

Isipingo Beach has limited access and can only be accessed through The Avenue East via the R102 in Prospecton.

Religious sites 

There are a number of Hindu temples, four mosques; Isipingo Hills Musjid, Isipingo Beach Musjid, Taleemuddeen Maddrassa Mosque, and Musjid Muqarrabeen, Masjid Mehboobia in Isipingo rail and numerous Christian churches.

Landmarks and important sites 

Isipingo Temple, founded in 1870, dedicated to the Goddess Marieaman
The grave of Dick King.
Toyota manufacturing plant in Prospecton.
SAPREF Oil Refinery (owned by Shell and BP)
The town also a has a transit camp on the main road, created as a result of the FIFA World Cup 2010.
Numerous Hindu Temples including Isipingo Hindi Sabha in Isipingo Hills, Dharam Mandhir in Lotus Park and Shree Hanuman Mandhir in Orient Hills

Notes and references

External links
 Isipingo Secondary alumni website

Populated places in eThekwini Metropolitan Municipality
KwaZulu-Natal South Coast